Oliver Newton "Jim" Clayton (13 April 1911 – 9 June 1992) was a New Zealand rower.

At the 1938 British Empire Games he won the silver medal as part of the men's coxed four as their stroke. He was a member of the Petone Rowing Club, and his team members in the 1938 boat were Albert Hope, Ken Boswell, John Rigby, and George Burns (cox).

References

New Zealand male rowers
Rowers at the 1938 British Empire Games
Commonwealth Games silver medallists for New Zealand
1911 births
1992 deaths
Commonwealth Games medallists in rowing
Medallists at the 1938 British Empire Games